Balanus glandula (North American Acorn Barnacle, Common Acorn Barnacle) is one of the most common barnacle species on the Pacific coast of North America, distributed from the U.S. state of Alaska to Bahía de San Quintín near San Quintín, Baja California. They are commonly found in the upper intertidal zone on mussels, rocks and pier pilings. They can obtain oxygen from both water and air.

The shell is formed by overlapping plates and has a calcareous basis. It has more the shape of a cylinder than the shape of a cone. The white operculum has heavily ridged walls. It can live up to ten years.

It has been intensely studied in recent years as a model species for linking physical oceanography and population genetics (or phylogeography) surveys. This species was introduced to the shores of Argentina in the 1960s, and has become an invasive species, displacing other barnacles and mussels.

References

Barnacles
Crustaceans of the eastern Pacific Ocean
Crustaceans described in 1854
Taxa named by Charles Darwin